Anna van Brummen (born 14 August 1994) is an American fencer. She qualified to represent Team USA in the 2020 Tokyo Summer Olympics, competing as part of the Women's Épée Team, which ranked 5th.

Career highlights 

 2017 Pan American Championships (Team), gold
 2017 NCAA Championships, gold
 2016 Suzhou World Cup, gold
 2016 July Challenge (Division I), gold
 2016 December North American Cup (Division I), bronze
 2015 NCAA Championships, bronze

References

External links
 Anna van Brummen at USA Fencing
 Princeton Tigers bio

1994 births
Living people
American female épée fencers
Olympic fencers of the United States
Fencers at the 2020 Summer Olympics
Princeton Tigers fencers
Pan American Games medalists in fencing
21st-century American women
20th-century American women
Pan American Games gold medalists for the United States
Fencers at the 2015 Pan American Games
Medalists at the 2019 Pan American Games